Thread herring may refer to either of two herring-like fish in the family Clupeidae:

 Atlantic thread herring (Opisthonema oglinum)
 Pacific thread herring  (Opisthonema libertate)